Thomas Cijan (born 29 December 1960) is an Austrian ice hockey player. He competed in the men's tournaments at the 1984 Winter Olympics and the 1988 Winter Olympics.

References

External links

1960 births
Living people
Olympic ice hockey players of Austria
Ice hockey players at the 1984 Winter Olympics
Ice hockey players at the 1988 Winter Olympics
Sportspeople from Klagenfurt